Unitarian or Unitarianism may refer to:

Christian and Christian-derived theologies
A Unitarian is a follower of, or a member of an organisation that follows, any of several theologies referred to as Unitarianism:

 Unitarianism (1565–present), a liberal Christian theological movement known for its belief in the unitary nature of God, and for its rejection of the doctrines of the Trinity, original sin, predestination, and of biblical inerrancy
 Unitarian Universalism (often referring to themselves as "UUs" or "Unitarians"), a primarily North American liberal pluralistic religious movement that grew out of Unitarianism
 In everyday British usage, "Unitarian" refers to the organisation formally known as the General Assembly of Unitarian and Free Christian Churches, which holds beliefs similar to Unitarian Universalists
 International Council of Unitarians and Universalists, an umbrella organization
 American Unitarian Association, a religious denomination in the United States and Canada, formed in 1825 and consolidated in 1961 with the Universalist Church of America to form the Unitarian Universalist Association
 Canadian Unitarian Council, an institution that joined the Unitarian Universalist Association in 1961 and left by agreement in 2002 to provide almost all equivalent services for Unitarian Universalists in Canada
 Biblical Unitarianism, a scripture-fundamentalist non-Trinitarian movement (flourished c.1876-1929)
 Nontrinitarianism, a generic name for a Christian point of view that rejects the Trinity doctrine

Other religious theologies
 The English translation of the Arabic term  Muwaḥḥid (plural  Muwaḥḥidūn), alternately meaning "monotheist", which may refer to:
 The Almohad Caliphate, a dynasty and movement in the Maghreb and Al-Andalus
 The endonym of the Druze people, a monotheistic ethnoreligious community, found primarily in Syria, Lebanon, Israel and Jordan
 The self-description of many Salafi and Wahhabi groups
 An endonym of the Unitarian Bahá’ís, a Bahá’í division centred on a revival of the claims of Mirza Muhammad Ali

Politics
Unitary state, a political system where a country is governed as one single unit
 A member of the Unitarian Party of Argentine history
 A period of the Argentine Civil War, the Unitarian-Federalist War: 1828–31

Other uses
 A scholar who holds that the works of Homer were composed by a single individual (see Homeric scholarship)

See also
Unification Church
Unity Church
United Reform Church

Unitarianism